João Roberto Rota Neto (born 21 May 2003) is a Brazilian professional footballer who plays as a winger for Portuguese team Benfica B on loan from Famalicão.

Professional career
Neto made his professional debut with Famalicão in a 2–2 Primeira Liga tie with Sporting CP on 5 December 2020. At 17 years and 6 months old, he was the youngest ever player to make his professional debut with Famalicão.

On 1 September 2021, he joined Benfica B on loan.

Honours
Benfica
 UEFA Youth League: 2021–22

References

External links
 
 

2003 births
Footballers from São Paulo
Living people
Brazilian footballers
Association football wingers
F.C. Famalicão players
S.L. Benfica B players
Primeira Liga players
Liga Portugal 2 players
Brazilian expatriate footballers
Brazilian expatriate sportspeople in Portugal
Expatriate footballers in Portugal